Diana Eleanor Greenway,  (born 1937) is a British retired historian and academic, who specialised in medieval history and palaeography. She taught at the Institute of Historical Research from 1964 to 2003, and she was Reader in Medieval History (1993–1998) and then Professor of Medieval History (1998–2003) at the University of London.

Honours
In 2001, Greenway was elected a Fellow of the British Academy (FBA), the United Kingdom's national academy for the humanities and social sciences. In 2011, she was made a Freeman of the City of London.

Selected works

References

1937 births
Living people
British women historians
British medievalists
Women medievalists
British palaeographers
Academics of the School of Advanced Study
Fellows of the British Academy